Arhan may refer to:
 Arhat, a concept in Buddhism
 Arihant (Jainism)
 Arhan, Iran, a village in Zanjan Province, Iran
 Arhaan, an Indian name (including a list of people with the name)

See also 
 Arxan